Emma Katy Forbes (née Clarke; born 14 May 1965 in Hammersmith, London) is an English radio and television presenter.

Biography
Forbes's parents are Nanette Newman and Bryan Forbes (né John Theobald Clarke). She attended Hurst Lodge School.

Forbes presented the cooking slot on Going Live!, a position she won after bombarding the production office with ideas for 'makes'. She was then selected as co-presenter for the replacement BBC children's show Live & Kicking with Andi Peters from 1993 through to 1996 and also presented ITV's teenage problem show Speakeasy.

From 1994 to 1997, Forbes hosted a Meridian Television revival of the panel show What's My Line?. (Her mother had been a regular panellist on the 1970s BBC version of the show.) She has voiced Mummy Hippo in the children's animated series, Peppa Pig. She also presented the Heart 106.2 breakfast show, alongside Jonathan Coleman, before she left to present on Capital 95.8.

Forbes was the face of a long-running television advert campaign for Head & Shoulders shampoo in the mid-to-late 1990s. In 1996, she was voted number 64 in the FHM 100 Sexiest Women Poll, and has been represented by Storm Models.

Alongside Mark Radcliffe, Forbes has co-hosted the Steve Wright show on BBC Radio 2. Also on BBC Radio 2 Forbes presented a Saturday show from 6 pm to 8 pm alongside comedian Alan Carr called Going Out with Alan Carr, and a Sunday morning breakfast show, replacing Pete Mitchell. On 13 December 2009, she announced that she would no longer be presenting her Sunday show on BBC Radio 2, but she continued to co-present Going Out With Alan Carr on Saturday evenings until April 2010. From March 2011, Forbes was a regular discussion contributor on ITV's daytime show The Alan Titchmarsh Show, which ended in November 2014.

Personal life
Forbes lives with her banker husband Graham Clempson (married September 1987) and has two children, born 1996 and 1999. She suffered from postnatal depression after both births. Forbes was Richard Attenborough's god-daughter. When she took a professional break to have her two children, Forbes and her journalist sister Sarah Standing started a shop in Belgravia, London. Forbes is a party organiser. Forbes is also a patron of Great Ormond Street Hospital.

References

External links

1965 births
Actresses from London
BBC Radio 2 presenters
English voice actresses
English television presenters
English radio presenters
Alumni of the Italia Conti Academy of Theatre Arts
Living people
People educated at Hurst Lodge School
People from Hammersmith
British women radio presenters